Felix Schulze (born 21 October 1980) is a German curler. He was born in Hamburg. He competed at the 2011 European Curling Championships in Moscow, at the 2012 World Curling Championships in Basel, and at the 2014 Winter Olympics in Sochi.

References

External links 
 
 

1980 births
Living people
Sportspeople from Hamburg
Curlers at the 2014 Winter Olympics
German male curlers
Olympic curlers of Germany